Adiel de Oliveira Amorim (born 13 August 1980), known simply as Adiel, is a Brazilian former professional footballer who played as a midfielder.

Club statistics

References

External links

1980 births
Living people
Brazilian footballers
Brazilian expatriate footballers
Santos FC players
Brazilian expatriate sportspeople in Japan
Urawa Red Diamonds players
Brazilian expatriate sportspeople in Kuwait
Botafogo Futebol Clube (SP) players
Shonan Bellmare players
Expatriate footballers in Japan
Expatriate footballers in China
Brazilian expatriate sportspeople in China
China League One players
J1 League players
J2 League players
Expatriate footballers in Kuwait
Association football midfielders
Qadsia SC players
Kuwait Premier League players
People from Cubatão